David Jude Jolicoeur (September 21, 1968 – February 12, 2023), also known as Trugoy the Dove, Plug Two, and Dave, was an American rapper best known as one third of the hip hop group De La Soul. 

Along with the other members of De La Soul, Jolicoeur was a member of the collective Native Tongues. Jolicoeur co-wrote the Gorillaz song "Feel Good Inc.", which featured De La Soul and won a Grammy Award in 2006 for Best Pop Collaboration with Vocals.

Life and career

Jolicoeur was born in Brooklyn, New York City, to Haitian-American parents, but he grew up in the Long Island hamlet of East Massapequa.

In his teen years, he attended Amityville Memorial High School in the Amityville area of Long Island, where he met and became friends with Vincent Mason, Kelvin Mercer, and Paul Huston. After they had separate solo spells in local groups, Jolicoeur, Mason, and Mercer eventually decided to form a rap group themselves, reuniting under the name De La Soul; they adopted the stage names, respectively, Trugoy the Dove, Maseo, and Posdnuos. Later in his career, Jolicoeur revealed that the first part of his stage name was just a humorous take on the anadrome of the word "yogurt". Huston, best known as Prince Paul, kept working with the trio as their producer.

With their eccentric fashion styles paired with the positive messages of the group's debut effort, 3 Feet High and Rising, the image led to critics and journalists labelling the members as "the hippies of hip hop" (a title that the group was quick to refute with the release of the second album De La Soul Is Dead in 1991).

Illness and death 
In the last years of his life, Jolicoeur was diagnosed with congestive heart failure and had to wear a LifeVest defibrillator machine in order to counteract its symptoms.

He revealed his health issues publicly for the first time in November 2017, in the opening scene for the music video of "Royalty Capes", a track from De La Soul's 2016 album, And the Anonymous Nobody.... At the start of the video, Jolicoeur talked about how his heart problems affected his ability to perform and tour with the group consistently, saying: "[The LifeVest defibrillator] will shock me, and hopefully bring me back from the matrix. I'm ready just to get back to the stage. I miss it. I love traveling; I love being around my guys. And I want that back."

On February 5, 2023, De La Soul took part in a special performance for the 50 Years of Hip-Hop at the 65th Annual Grammy Awards, performing their 1988 song, "Buddy"; however, Jolicoeur was not on stage with his group mates.

One week later, on February 12, 2023, his representative Tony Ferguson announced that Jolicoeur had died at age 54, with the cause of his death remaining undisclosed. Following the announcement, the late artist received tributes from several important figures in the hip hop industry.

References

1968 births
2023 deaths
21st-century American male musicians
21st-century American rappers
American rappers of Haitian descent
De La Soul members
Grammy Award winners
Rappers from Brooklyn
Record producers from New York (state)
Place of death missing